This is a list of wars involving the Republic of Paraguay from 1810 to the present day.

See also
 Paraguay Expedition (United States Navy expedition to Asunción)

Footnotes

 
Paraguay
Military history of Paraguay
Wars